Freedom Puriza (born 22 June 1980) is a retired Namibian football defender. He was capped several times for Namibia, including the 2008 and 2013 COSAFA Cups.

References

1980 births
Living people
Namibian men's footballers
Association football defenders
African Stars F.C. players
F.C. AK players
Eleven Arrows F.C. players
Lamontville Golden Arrows F.C. players
Namibia international footballers
Namibian expatriate footballers
Expatriate soccer players in South Africa
Namibian expatriate sportspeople in South Africa
Footballers from Windhoek